Hope is a 2014 French drama film directed by Boris Lojkine. It was screened as part of the International Critics' Week section at the 2014 Cannes Film Festival where it won the SACD Award.

Cast
 Endurance Newton as Hope
 Justin Wang as Léonard

References

External links
 

2014 films
2014 drama films
French drama films
2010s French-language films
2010s English-language films
2010s French films
2014 multilingual films
French multilingual films